Lucas Benedito Cândido (born 19 March 1989) is a Brazilian handball player for Ciudad de Guadalajara and the Brazilian handball team.

He won a gold medal at the 2015 Pan American Games and competed at the 2016 Summer Olympics and 2013 and 2015 world championships.

Achievements
Pan American Men's Club Handball Championship:
2014, 2015, 2016
South and Central American Men's Club Handball Championship:
2019, 2021

Individual awards and achievements
2016 Pan American Men's Club Handball Championship: Best right wing

References

1989 births
Living people
Brazilian male handball players
Pan American Games medalists in handball
Pan American Games gold medalists for Brazil
Handball players at the 2016 Summer Olympics
Olympic handball players of Brazil
Handball players at the 2015 Pan American Games
People from Guarulhos
Expatriate handball players
Brazilian expatriate sportspeople in Spain
Liga ASOBAL players
Medalists at the 2015 Pan American Games
Sportspeople from São Paulo (state)
21st-century Brazilian people